Baena is a town in southern Spain.

Baena may also refer to:

People
 Álex Baena (born 2001), Spanish footballer
 Carlos Baena (disambiguation)
 César Baena (born 1961), Venezuelan footballer
 Jeff Baena (born 1977), American film director and writer
 Juan Baena (1950–2012), Spanish footballer
 Juan Alfonso de Baena (died 1435), Castilian poet
 Marisa Baena (born 1977), Colombian golfer
 Mark Baena (born 1968), American soccer player
 Raúl Baena (born 1989), Spanish association football player

Other uses 
 Baena (genus), an extinct genus of turtles
 Baenã language, an extinct language of Brazil
 Cancionero de Baena, a medieval song-book